The Jacques and Amelia Reinhart House in southeast Portland in the U.S. state of Oregon is a 2.5-story dwelling listed on the National Register of Historic Places. A Colonial Revival structure built in 1911, it was added to the register in 1985. It was the first house built in Portland's Eastmoreland district, near Reed College.

See also
 National Register of Historic Places listings in Southeast Portland, Oregon

References

1911 establishments in Oregon
Colonial Revival architecture in Oregon
Eastmoreland, Portland, Oregon
Houses completed in 1911
Houses on the National Register of Historic Places in Portland, Oregon
Portland Historic Landmarks